Ervand Abrahamian (born 1940) is an Iranian-American historian of the Middle East. He is Distinguished Professor of History at Baruch College and the Graduate Center of the City University of New York and is widely regarded as one of the leading historians of modern Iran.

Early life
Ervand Vahan Abrahamian was born in 1940 in Tehran to Armenian parents. He attended three grades at the Mehr School in Tehran and was later sent off to Rugby School (1954-59), a prestigious boarding school in England. He received his BA from Oxford University in 1963. He mainly studied European history with Keith Thomas.

He then moved to New York City, where he studied at Columbia University and received his first MA in 1966. He received a second MA from Oxford in 1968. Abrahamian obtained a PhD from Columbia in 1969. His thesis was titled "Social Bases of Iranian Politics: The Tudeh Party, 1941-53." Abrahamian has stated that his "understanding of Iran [was] ... most shaped [by] the oil crisis of 1951-53 culminating in the coup."

Abrahamian was an activist and a member of the Confederation of Iranian Students — National Union (CISNU) that opposed the rule of Shah Mohammad Reza Pahlavi in the 1960s and 1970s. As of 1976, he was one of the vice chairpersons of the Committee for Artistic and Intellectual Freedom in Iran (CAIFI), a "minor front" of the Socialist Workers Party (SWP).

Abrahamian is a naturalized American citizen. He is known to his friends as "Jed".

In 1967 Abrahamian was engaged to Helen Mary Harbison, the daughter of late historian E. Harris Harbison. As of 2019, he is married to Mary Nolan, Professor Emerita of History at New York University (NYU). He has two children, Emma and Rafi.

Career
Abrahamian has formerly taught at Princeton University, New York University and Oxford University. However, he has spent most of his career at the City University of New York (CUNY). He is currently Distinguished Professor of History at Baruch College and the Graduate Center of CUNY. His research interests include the history and politics of the Middle East, primarily Iran.

He regularly comments on Iran's politics and economy, foreign relations of Iran, including Iran–United States relations. Abrahamian is considered an authority on Iranian opposition movements, including the People's Mujahedin of Iran (MEK).

He has appeared as a guest on BBC Persian, Charlie Rose, Worldfocus, Amanpour & Company, Democracy Now!, Lou Dobbs Tonight, and other series and channels.

Views
In a preface to his 1989 book, Abrahamian describes himself as "a sceptic by intellectual training; a democratic socialist by political preference; and, as far as religious conviction is concerned, an agnostic on most days — on other days, an atheist." In 1983 he told The New York Times that he has an "independent Marxist point of view." Christoph Marcinkowski wrote that Abrahamian's publications "feature more or less the left-wing political perspective of their author – especially in terms of socio-political and socio-economic analysis." He has been influenced by Marxist historians Christopher Hill, Eric Hobsbawm, E. P. Thompson and others. He has called Thompson a "towering figure for a number of reasons — not just for historians of Iran, but also for Marxist historians throughout the world." He is generally sympathetic towards the Tudeh Party. Werner has described Abrahamian as a "vivid chronicler of the history of the Iranian Left, defying any attempt to view twentieth-century Iran exclusively through an Islamicate lens."

In 2007 Abrahamian called the theory of the US government being behind the September 11 attacks "absurd." He compared it to claims of Iran supporting anti-US Sunni insurgents in Iraq, calling the latter "just not possible." Abrahamian opined that if the US conducts airstrikes on Iran and triggers a war, it would last 30 to 100 years.

In a 1986 he objected that The New York Times obituary of Loy W. Henderson did not mention his role in the 1953 Iranian coup d'état, which he described as "probably his most important contribution." He wrote to the Times: "Few ambassadors have so decisively changed the course of a country's history. What is more, he set a State Department precedent by permitting secret agents to use the embassy compound to carry out the coup. Your oversight would have amused George Orwell; it certainly would not have surprised him."

In 2006 he described Iran as a "third world power." In 2017 he noted that the "gradual but consistent shift to the right in recent years naturally erodes this welfare state and thereby undermines the social basis of the regime." He has described the People's Mujahedin of Iran (MEK) as a "mystical cult."

Abrahamian has said that "heroes are to be avoided." He has described Donald Trump as "at heart a con man spouting out verbiage to sell a particular product." He called the Trump presidency a "nightmare."

Publications
Abrahamian has authored or coauthored the following books:

Iran Between Two Revolutions
Abrahamian's best known and most cited book is Iran Between Two Revolutions (1982), published by Princeton University Press. It is an account of the history of Iran from the Constitutional Revolution of 1905–06 to the Islamic Revolution of 1978–79.

Initial reviews were largely positive. Criticisms included disproportional focus on the Communist movement and the Tudeh Party, and reliance on British archives. Sepehr Zabih wrote that it is constrained by the ideological bias of neo-Marxist approach of E. P. Thompson. M. E. Yapp wrote: "with all its imperfections, Abrahamian's book is the most interesting and exciting book on the recent history of Iran which has appeared for many years." Zabih was more reserved: "this work is a significant addition to the literature on some aspects of the Iranian communist movement. The author is well versed in the selected periods of recent Iranian history. No one with sustained interest in Iranian politics, especially those of the left, could afford to ignore this volume." Gene R. Garthwaite wrote that the book made three significant contributions: "its class analysis will force all of us-Marxist and non-Marxist alike-to re-examine our ideas about Iran's twentieth-century history and will provide the basis for discussion for some time to come; it gives the best account of the development of the Tudeh party and its social, intellectual, and political bases; and it presents the most detailed account of the Pahlavi period (ca. 1921-78) and its political history." Mazzaoui described it as "the best and most balanced account of the social and political developments in contemporary Persian history."

Radical Islam: The Iranian Mojahedin
In Radical Islam: The Iranian Mojahedin (1989) Abrahamian investigated the origins and history of the People's Mujahedin of Iran (MEK). He concludes that the MEK has become a "religio-political sect" and a cult of personality, "at its most extreme," has been formed around its leader, Massoud Rajavi. It was well received by reviewers. Eric Hooglund called it a "very important book" that provides "detailed, objective, and erudite analysis" of the MEK. He also argued that its most important contribution is the exposition of the party's ideology. Mazzaoui wrote: "There is very little to criticize in this masterfully written piece of current research. Dr. Abrahamian writes sympathetically and at times dramatically-but always as an accomplished scholar."

Khomeinism
Abrahamian's 1993 book on Iran's first Supreme Leader, Ruhollah Khomeini and his ideology, is entitled Khomeinism. The book consisted of five essays. He argued that Khomeinism is "best understood as a populist movement, not a religious resurgence." He described Khomeini's movement as a form of Third World populism. Fred Halliday called it a "superb study of political ideology in general and of the ideological evolution of the founder of the Islamic Republic in particular." Baktiari had a mixed review. He noted that it is well written, but "far from well documented." However, he called it a "stimulating book that deserves wide readership." Fakhreddin Azimi described it as a "lucid and provocative book."

Tortured Confessions
Abrahamian's 1999 book Tortured Confessions: Prisons and Public Recantations in Modern Iran covers political repressions against opposition movements both before and after the Islamic Revolution, ending with the mass executions of 1988. It reviews interrogation tactics and prison facilities used in 20th century Iran. It was well received by critics. Mahdi praised it as a significant and timely book.

A History of Modern Iran
A History of Modern Iran, published in 2008, was widely praised. The book narrates state building of modern Iran. John Limbert called it a "scholarly, readable, and engaging study of the last century of Iranian history." Philip S. Khoury went as far as to describe it as "the most intelligent and perceptive history of modern Iran available in the English language."

The Coup
Abrahamian's 2013 book The Coup: 1953, the CIA, and the Roots of Modern U.S.-Iranian Relations was met with mixed to favorable reviews. David S. Painter opined that "Despite some problems, The Coup is a valuable corrective to previous work and an important contribution to Iranian history." Mark Gasiorowski was more critical. He argued that the book does not provide any "major new revelations or insights and is misleading in several ways."

Recognition
He is widely recognized a leading historian of modern Iran, and, by some, as the "preeminent historian of modern Iran." He has also been described as "one of the preeminent Iranian historians of his generation." Mansour Farhang noted that his books are "indispensable source of information, insight and analysis for scholars and general readers as well." In 1995 Fred Halliday opined in Iranian Studies that Ervand Abrahamian "has already established himself as one of the finest writers on twentieth-century Iran." Eric Hooglund wrote in 2000 that Abrahamian's books have "established his reputation as the leading scholar of Iran's twentieth-century social history." Reza Afshari wrote in 2002 that since the publication of the seminal Iran Between Two Revolutions (1982), Abrahamian has "become one of the most influential historians of modern Iran."

He was elected Fellow of the American Academy of Arts and Sciences in 2010. He is a member of the Middle East Studies Association of North America and the American Historical Association.

References
Notes

Citations

External links
CUNY Distinguished Professor Ervand Abrahamian
 

1940 births
Living people
Writers from Tehran
People from Park Slope
Iranian people of Armenian descent
American people of Armenian descent
Naturalized citizens of the United States
Iranian emigrants to the United Kingdom
Alumni of St John's College, Oxford
Columbia University alumni
Princeton University faculty
New York University faculty
City University of New York faculty
Baruch College faculty
Graduate Center, CUNY faculty
Iranian Iranologists
Historians of Iran
20th-century American historians
American Marxist historians
Fellows of the American Academy of Arts and Sciences
Ethnic Armenian historians
Social historians
Iranian expatriate academics
20th-century Iranian people
21st-century American historians